Thomas Cole  (1622–1681) was an English politician who sat in the House of Commons  in 1656 and 1660.

Cole was the son of Thomas Cole of Liss and his wife Mary Waller, daughter of Thomas Waller of Beaconsfield, Buckinghamshire. He was baptised on 15 January 1622. He entered Gray's Inn in 1641.

Cole was commissioner for execution of ordinances for Hampshire in 1645 and commissioner for assessment for Hampshire from 1647 to 1652. In 1648 he was commissioner for militia for Hampshire and was a JP for  Hampshire by 1650.  He was commissioner for security for Hampshire from 1655 to 1656. In 1656, Cole was elected Member of Parliament for Hampshire in the Second Protectorate Parliament. He was commissioner for assessment for Hampshire in 1657 and commissioner for militia in 1659 and 1660. In January 1660 he was commissioner for assessment for Hampshire and by April 1660 he was  freeman of Portsmouth and Winchester. In April 1660 he was elected MP for Petersfield and Winchester and may not have resolved his preference by the time parliament was dissolved.

Cole became captain of militia for  Hampshire in November 1660 and was reinstated as JP for Hampshire in 1662. Following his second marriage, he lived mainly in Northamptonshire and was commissioner for assessment for   Northamptonshire in 1663. He was High Sheriff of Hampshire in 1663 and became Deputy Lieutenant in 1667. In 1670 he became JP for Northamptonshire.

Cole married  firstly Elizabeth Harvey, daughter of Sir Stephen Harvey of Colchester End, Hardingstone Northamptonshire in December 1651. There were no children and after her death in 1659 he married secondly Judith Tryon, widow of Peter Tryon of Bulwick, Northamptonshire and daughter of Abraham Cullen, merchant, of Great St. Helens, London by licence on 23 April 1662. They had a son and daughter.

References

1622 births
1681 deaths
Members of Gray's Inn
High Sheriffs of Hampshire
Politicians from Winchester
English MPs 1656–1658
English MPs 1660